The Night Market Station is the terminus station for Line 02 and Line 03 on the Phnom Penh BRT bus rapid transit network in central Phnom Penh, Cambodia, located on Sisowath Quay.

Nearby Attractions
 Foreign Correspondents' Club, Phnom Penh
 Night Market
 Wat Phnom

See also
 Phnom Penh City Bus
 Transport in Phnom Penh
 Line 02 (Phnom Penh Bus Rapid Transit)
 Line 03 (Phnom Penh Bus Rapid Transit)

External links
 Official Page of Phnom Penh Municipal Bus Services

Phnom Penh Bus Rapid Transit stations